Anadolu Efes Spor Kulübü, formerly known as Efes Pilsen, is a Turkish professional basketball team based in Istanbul, Turkey. Efes is the most recent Euroleague champion and on the first place of European Club Ranking after the Final Four 2020-21. Efes is also the most successful club in the history of the Turkish Super League (BSL), having won the league's championship 15 times. Efes has won a total of 40 domestic trophies, more than any other Turkish basketball club.

The home arena of Anadolu Efes S.K. is the Sinan Erdem Dome in Istanbul, which has a seating capacity of 16,000 for basketball games. The club has its own practice facility in the district of Bahçelievler, which was built in 1982. The team competes in the Turkish Super League and the EuroLeague. The team is owned by the Efes Beverage Group.

Anadolu Efes has developed a fierce rivalry with Fenerbahçe in recent years. The two clubs often meet in playoff series and cup finals.

History

The club was established in 1976 as Efes Pilsen S.K., by taking over the Turkish second-division club Kadıköyspor, which had failed due to financial problems. Its initial sponsor was its former longtime namesake, Efes Pilsen, a subsidiary of the Anadolu Group. It won the 1978 Turkish second division national championship undefeated, earning promotion to the Turkish first division, where it has continuously competed ever since. In its first top-flight season (1978–79), Efes Pilsen S.K. won the Turkish national league title, immediately establishing itself as one of the country's top clubs.

After finishing 2nd in the 1992–93 FIBA European Cup, Efes Pilsen S.K. won the 1995–96 FIBA Korać Cup, which marked the first-ever European-wide title won by a Turkish club in any team sport. Efes Pilsen S.K. (later renamed Anadolu Efes S.K.) has also become a fixture in the European-wide top-tier level EuroLeague, making it to the competition's EuroLeague Final Four in 2000, and also to the FIBA SuproLeague's 2001 Final Four, and finishing 3rd on both occasions.

In 2011, the club changed its name to Anadolu Efes S.K., after the TAPDK (Tobacco and Alcohol Market Regulatory Authority) in Turkey prohibited the advertisement of tobacco and alcohol products in sports organizations.

In the 2017–18 season, Efes finished in the 16th and last place in the EuroLeague.

In the 2018–19 season, Efes had success in the EuroLeague as it managed to clinch the fourth-seed in the regular season. In the play-offs, the team beat FC Barcelona to advance to its first EuroLeague Final Four in 19 years. In the semi-final, Efes beat Fenerbahçe 92–73 to reach its first EuroLeague Final in history. In the championship game, Efes was defeated by CSKA Moscow, eventually finishing as the runner-up. In the same season, Efes won its first BSL championship since 2009. In Game 7 of the Finals against Fenerbahçe, Efes won 89–74 after Shane Larkin scored 38 points. Larkin was later named BSL Finals MVP.

In the 2020-2021 and 2021-2022 seasons Anadolu Efes won back-to-back EuroLeague Championships.

Home arenas
Abdi İpekçi Arena:  1986–2010, 2012–2017
Sinan Erdem Dome:  2010–2012, 2017–present

For many years, Efes has used the Abdi İpekçi Arena, with a seating capacity of 12,270, to host its home games. Currently, Efes uses the 16,000 seat Sinan Erdem Dome for its home games.

Players

Current roster

Depth chart

Retired numbers

Honours

Domestic competitions
 Turkish Super League
 Winners (15) (record): 1978–79, 1982–83, 1983–84, 1991–92, 1992–93, 1993–94, 1995–96, 1996–97, 2001–02, 2002–03, 2003–04, 2004–05, 2008–09, 2018–19, 2020–21
 Runners-up (12): 1985–86, 1997–98, 1998–99, 1999–00, 2000–01, 2005–06, 2006–07, 2009–10, 2011–12, 2014–15, 2015–16, 2021–22
 Turkish Cup
 Winners (12) (record): 1993–94, 1995–96, 1996–97, 1997–98, 2000–01, 2001–02, 2005–06, 2006–07, 2008–09, 2014–15, 2018, 2022
 Runners-up (4): 2003–04, 2013–14, 2017, 2019
 Turkish Presidential Cup
 Winners (13) (record): 1986, 1992, 1993, 1996, 1998, 2000, 2006, 2009, 2010, 2015, 2018, 2019, 2022
 Runners-up (11): 1994, 1997, 1999, 2001, 2002, 2003, 2004, 2005, 2007, 2012, 2016

European competitions
 EuroLeague
 Winners (2): 2020–21, 2021–22
 Runners-up (1): 2018–19
 3rd place (2): 1999–00, 2000–01
 Final Four (5): 2000, 2001, 2019, 2021, 2022
 FIBA Saporta Cup (defunct)
 Runners-up (1): 1992–93
 FIBA Korać Cup (defunct)
 Winners (1): 1995–96

Other competitions
 FIBA International Christmas Tournament (defunct)
 3rd place (1): 1996

Sondrio, Italy Invitational Game
 Winners (1): 2008

 Bandirma Invitational Game
 Winners (1): 2008

 Sarajevo Invitational Game
 Winners (1): 2010

 Istanbul, Turkey Invitational Game
 Winners (1): 2014

 Crete Heraklion Basketball Tournament
 Winners (1): 2016

 TUBAD Basketball Tournament
 Winners (1): 2018

 Zadar Basketball Tournament
 Winners: 2019

 Gloria Cup
 Winners (2): 2020, 2021

Notable players

  Cedi Osman
  Furkan Korkmaz
  Volkan Aydın
  Tamer Oyguç
  Murat Evliyaoğlu
  Hüseyin Beşok
  Ufuk Sarıca
  Mehmet Okur
  Hidayet Türkoğlu
  İbrahim Kutluay
  Serkan Erdoğan
  Alper Yılmaz
  Erdal Bibo
  Ömer Onan
  Mustafa Abi
  Kaya Peker
  Ender Arslan
  Ersan İlyasova
  Sinan Güler
  Kerem Tunçeri
  Semih Erden
  Kerem Gönlüm
  Cenk Akyol
  Berk Demir 
  Birkan Batuk
  Muhaymin Mustafa
  Samet Geyik 
  Onuralp Bitim 
  Mirsad Türkcan 
 - Ermal Kuqo
  Brock Motum  
  Džanan Musa
  Damir Mulaomerović
  Dario Šarić
  Marko Popović
  Nikola Prkačin
  Nikola Vujčić
  Mario Kasun
  Zoran Planinić
  Stanko Barać
  Thomas Heurtel
  Stéphane Lasme
  Michalis Kakiouzis
  Stratos Perperoglou
  Kaspars Kambala
  Saulius Štombergas
  Petar Naumoski
  Predrag Drobnjak
  Vlado Šćepanović
  Goran Nikolić
  Slavko Vraneš
  Milko Bjelica
 - Daniel Santiago
  Vasili Karasev
  Zoran Savić
  Dušan Kecman
  Igor Rakočević
  Duško Savanović 
  Vladimir Štimac
  Jurica Golemac
  Boštjan Nachbar 
  Zoran Dragić  
  Edo Murić  
  Alen Omić  
 - Sasha Vujačić 
  Esteban Batista
  Conrad McRae
  Larry Richard
  Marcus Brown
  Trajan Langdon
  Willie Solomon
  Drew Nicholas
  Scott Roth
  Anthony Mason
 - Henry Domercant
  Marcus Haislip
  Chris Corchiani
  Brian Howard
  Andrew Wisniewski
  Derrick Alston
  Rickie Winslow
  Kenny Green 
  Alex Tyus
  Jon Diebler 
  Bryce Cotton 
  Toney Douglas
  Derrick Brown
  Ricky Ledo
  Tyler Honeycutt 
  Josh Adams
  Errick McCollum
  Mark Pope
  Scoonie Penn
  Deshaun Thomas
  Bootsy Thornton
  Antonio Granger 
  Jayson Granger 
  Sonny Weems
  Kenny Gregory
  Charles Smith
 - Justin Doellman 
 - Preston Shumpert
 - Erwin Dudley
 - Jordan Farmar
  Jamon Gordon
  Matt Janning

Players at the NBA draft

Season by season

 Cancelled due to the COVID-19 pandemic in Europe.

International record

Matches against NBA teams
In 2006, Efes Pilsen became the first Turkish basketball club to be invited to play with NBA teams. They competed against the Denver Nuggets in Denver, Colorado on October 11, and against the Golden State Warriors in Oakland, California on October 12. In 2007, Efes Pilsen hosted the Minnesota Timberwolves at the Abdi İpekçi Arena.

Head coaches
 Rıza Erverdi (1983–1984)
 Aydan Siyavuş (1984–1986)
 Rusmir Halilovic (1986–1987)
 Aydan Siyavuş (1987–1990)
 Halil Üner (1990–1992)
 Aydın Örs (1992–1999)
 Ergin Ataman (1999–2001)
 Oktay Mahmuti (2001–2007)
 David Blatt (2007–2008)
 Ekrem Memnun (2008)
 Ergin Ataman (2008–2010)
 Velimir Perasović (2010–2011)
 Ufuk Sarıca (2011–2012)
 Ilias Zouros (2012)
 Oktay Mahmuti (2012–2013)
 Vangelis Angelou (2013–2014)
 Dušan Ivković (2014–2016)
 Ahmet Çakı (2016)
 Velimir Perasović (2016–2017)
 Ergin Ataman (2017–present)

References

External links

  
 Euroleague profile
 TBLStat.net profile
 Eurobasket.com profile

 
Basketball teams in Turkey
Basketball teams established in 1976
EuroLeague clubs
Turkish Basketball Super League teams
1976 establishments in Turkey
Sports teams in Istanbul